Hancock's Resolution is a historic two-storey gambrel-roofed stone farm house with shed-roofed dormers and interior end chimneys  located on a 15-acre (6.1 ha) farm at 2795 Bayside Beach Road in Pasadena, Anne Arundel County, Maryland, United States. In 1785 Stephen Hancock, Jr. built the original stone section as the main house for what was then a 410-acre (170 ha) farm. Additions to the house were built in 1855 and in about 1900. Stone and frame outbuildings remain, including a one-storey gable-roofed stone dairy. Hancock's Resolution remained in Hancock family ownership until the deaths in the 1960s of Mary Hancock and her brother, Henry Hancock, who left the property to Anne Arundel County to be preserved. Hancock's Resolution underwent a thorough restoration in 2000 and is now open to the public as a house museum.

On October 10, 1975, Hancock's Resolution was added to the National Register of Historic Places. Included in the designation were the additions, outbuildings and the Hancock family graveyard.

Gallery

References

External links
, including photo from 2002, at Maryland Historical Trust
Hancock's Resolution house museum website
 Hancock Family Descendants site for Hancock's Resolution
 Find A Grave listing for Hancocks Resolution Family Cemetery

Houses on the National Register of Historic Places in Maryland
Houses completed in 1670
Museums in Anne Arundel County, Maryland
Historic house museums in Maryland
Houses in Anne Arundel County, Maryland
Living museums in Maryland
Cemeteries in Maryland
Pasadena, Maryland
1670 establishments in Maryland
National Register of Historic Places in Anne Arundel County, Maryland